Maryland ritual killings was a series of ritualistic murders that occurred around Harper, Maryland County, Liberia in the 1970s. The crimes have been regarded as "Liberia's most notorious ritual killing case" due to the number of murders, the involvement of high ranking government officials and their subsequent public executions.

History
Between 1965 and 1977 over 100 murders occurred in Maryland County, many of which were considered ritualistic due to the mutilation and removal of body parts. During the 1970s, Liberians in Maryland County were constantly under the threat of ritual murders. Between November 1976 and July 1977, 14 people had disappeared in the county prompting Liberian president William Tolbert to fire Superintendent of Maryland County, James Daniel Anderson, who failed to report the missing people. Tolbert publicly declared "Anyone who kills deliberately: The law will kill that person".

These murders went unreported and uninvestigated until the murder of a local fisherman and popular singer, Moses Tweh. Tweh was abducted on June 26, 1977. His body was discovered on July 4, 1977, heavily mutilated with his eyes, ears, nose, tongue and penis removed. Prior to the discovery of Tweh's body, Wreh Taryonnoh, the girlfriend of Assistant Supervisor of Schools, Francis Nyepan, was allegedly heard by a group searching for Tweh saying that "if they would be so lucky to find him, only his bones they might see". This sparked the arrest of 12 people, a majority of whom were government officials.

Arrests
In July and early August 1977, 12 people were arrested:

Executed
James Daniel Anderson, Superintendent of Maryland County
Allen Nathaniel Yancy, Representative for Maryland County, House of Representatives
Francis Wlateh Nyepan, Assistant Supervisor of Schools
Philip B. Seyton, Senior Inspector of the Ministry of Commerce, Maryland County
Thomas Barclay, cook of Allen Yancy
Wreh Taryonnoh, girlfriend of Francis Nyepan
Putu Dueh

Died before execution
Wonplu Boye, domestic servant for Francis Nyapan
Kotee Weah, Chief Cook for the General Manager of the Firestone Company, Cavalla, Maryland County

Pardoned
Tagbedi Wisseh, Acting Chief of Grandcess residents in Harper

Released
Joshua W. Brown, Chief Security Officer, Liberia Sugar Company
Teah Toby, Kru Governor

The accused were forced to walk through the street naked "carrying two buckets loaded with sand". They were allegedly tortured during interrogation.

Trial

During the first Harper Trial, Joshua Brown and Teah Toby were released and later became state witnesses. The other ten defendants were found guilty and sentenced to public execution by hanging. Tagbedi Wisseh appealed his conviction and was pardoned by Tolbert before execution. Wonplu Boye and Koti Weah both died before execution, it was rumored their own family members poisoned them to avoid shame.

Execution
On 16 February 1979, the seven remaining people convicted of Moses Tweh's murder were publicly hanged at dawn in Harper. The media dubbed them the "Harper Seven".

See also 
 Crime in Liberia

References

Further reading

Murder in Liberia
Society of Liberia
African witchcraft
Crimes involving Satanism or the occult
Conspiracies
1965 murders in Africa
1977 murders in Africa
1960s murders in Africa
1970s murders in Africa